"Into the Fire" is a song by English alternative rock band Thirteen Senses, and is the opening track from their debut album, The Invitation. It was the second single released from the album in the United Kingdom on 13 September 2004 (see 2004 in British music). It peaked on the UK Singles Chart at number 35.

The song has featured in many television programs. It was used in the Season 2 preview trailer for the American comedy-drama Rescue Me, as well as in the pilot episode of the medical drama Grey's Anatomy, in the thirteenth episode of season eight, twelfth episode of season twelve, and again but a cover on episode twenty one of season eleven. Other TV appearances include the Season 3 premiere of The 4400, Season 2 episode 4 of Pretty Little Liars and a Second Season episode of Tru Calling. It also featured in the French film Les Chevaliers du ciel and the BBC Drama Waterloo Road. It was also featured briefly in A Night Of Heroes, on 21 December 2009.

In February 2011, a YouTube video montage of the anti-government uprising in Egypt used the song as its soundtrack. The video, edited by Tamaar Shabaan, attracted over one and a half million views in under a week.

In 2012, it was featured on the Burberry website, promoting the new Burberry The Britain watches.

Track listings
CD 1 (2004)
 "Into the Fire" (radio edit) [3:21]
 "Late Gazes" [5:10]

CD 2 (2004)
 "Into the Fire" (alternative album mix) [3:33]
 "Falling to the Ground" [4:16]
 "Tended to Break Us" (early demo) [1:24]

7-inch (2004)
 "Into the Fire" (album version) [3:38]
 "This is an Order" [2:16]

References

Thirteen Senses songs
2004 singles
2004 songs
Mercury Records singles
Black-and-white music videos